is a 2006 Japanese sports film based on the manga series of the same name by Takeshi Konomi. The film was directed by Yuichi Abe, written by Abe and Daisuke Habara and stars Kanata Hongo as Ryoma Echizen. It condenses the storyline from when Ryoma arrives in Japan to the match against Hyotei Academy. The film was released in Japan on May 13, 2006.

Plot

Twelve-year-old Ryoma Echizen is a tennis prodigy who has won four American Junior Tennis tournaments. His father, Nanjiroh, a famous tennis player, calls Ryoma back to Japan to attend the distinguished Seishun Academy. Ryoma, a first year, wants to be on the school team.

A girl watches Ryoma. Her name is Shioin Higaki, whose parents died in accident. She is mute. She first meets Ryoma when he protects her on a train from a loud group of boys.

Ryoma arrives at Seigaku, and is immediately challenged by Kaoru Kaidoh, a second year team regular, known as "the Viper", whose is known for his "Snake Shot". The members of the team watch the match: Vice-captain Shuichiro Oishi and his doubles partner Eiji Kikumaru; third year Shusuke Fuji, a tactical "genius"; Sadaharu Inui, who collects info on his opponents; and Takashi Kawamura, whose personality instantly changes when he grabs his racquet. The other second year regular is Takeshi Momoshiro, known for his power plays. Ryoma surprises everyone by pulling off the Snake Shot himself, but says it's just the Buggy Whip Shot. Kaidoh and Ryoma's match is interrupted by Kunimitsu Tezuka, the nationally ranked captain of the tennis club. Tezuka makes Kaidoh run laps for playing a match without an approval and takes an interest in Ryoma.

Ryoma is in time for the monthly ranking tournament, but due to his youth some do not take him seriously; during the tournament, Ryoma is quick to prove his skills and become the only first year on the team, just in time for the prefectural preliminary rounds.

In a crucial match against Fudomine Middle School, Ryoma injures his eye, but his determination to finish the match helps Seigaku advance to the Kanto Tournament. Tezuka is deeply troubled by Ryoma's style; it's an exact copy of his father's. He is also worried about his injured arm. Tezuka plays Ryoma and beats him, disregarding his physician's advice. He tells Ryoma to develop his own style of tennis.

As the Kanto Tournament draws near, Seigaku learn of their first opponent: rivals Hyotei Academy. All the regulars are chosen except Momoshiro, as Echizen is chosen over him. However, Echizen says he has to go back to America. Momoshiro is angry and refuses the jersey Ryoma offers. Egate Mcleod Higaki of Hyotei tries to provoke the players until Tezuka tells him to leave. Echizen goes to the park to think about his decision, and Shioin, Egate's little sister, comes by and plays her flute.  The music reaches Echizen's ears, and he makes his choice.

At the Kanto Tournament, Momo still has decided not to come.  Oishi and Eiji play Doubles 2. They begin a losing streak until Momo reveals himself in the cheering crowd for Seigaku. With new confidence from their returning teammate, the Golden Pair make a comeback, but lose to Hyotei 5–7. In the crowd, Kaidoh finds Echizen, who decided to stay. Kaidoh and Inui begin their Doubles 1 match. Kaidoh continually takes all the shots and uses his Boomerang Snake, while Inui stands and watches. Finally, he tells Kaidoh he has their opponents' data and they win the match 7–5. Kawamura plays Singles 3 and tries his Hadokyuu, but his big opponent copies the move. They both keep using Hadokyuu until Kawamura does the unthinkable: the dangerous one-handed Hadokyuu. His opponent copies, and both keep hitting until both of them drop their racquets, their hands and racquet handles covered in blood. The match is considered a No Game. Fuji, playing Singles 2, borrows Kawamura's racquet, and amazes his opponent with his Disappearing Serve and his Hakugei Triple Counter; he wins 6–0. Tezuka plays Singles 1 against the popular Atobe; Echizen comes and takes his place as bench coach, and, despite some of the other Seigaku players, Tezuka allows him to rejoin the team.

Atobe seems to gain the early lead, but Tezuka comes back with his Tezuka Zone and Drop Shot. Tezuka gets to match point, but as he tries to serve, his arm gives out. Tezuka continues to play as Echizen takes off his jacket, revealing his Seigaku uniform, and goes to practice. Tezuka loses in the tiebreak, 6–7. Because both teams have two wins, their reserve players will determine the winner. Echizen faces off against Egate, and wins the first game using his teammates' moves. However, as an eclipse passes over the court, Egate uses his brutal tennis form and injures Echizen's leg. Remembering his vow to become stronger, Echizen surprises everyone by using the COOL Drive attack to come back, break the eclipse, and won. Shioin finally cheers. Tezuka rewards Echizen with his Seigaku jacket he kept for him.

As Echizen looks up in the stands at their future opponents, his only reply to them is, "mada mada da ne" (a long way to go).

Cast

Original soundtrack
The soundtrack is composed by Tarō Iwashiro and was released in Japan on May 12, 2006. It also features music from the group, Yellow Cherry.

The track listing is as follows:

Alterations from the anime/manga
The film was a condensed version of the manga and anime series, thus a lot of the events that happen were condensed and characters were changed:
 Sumire Ryuzaki's age was changed so that instead of being a grandmother (and Nanjiro's junior middle school coach), she became a year younger than Nanjiro and became a former junior middle school student with him. She says that Nanjiro was her inspiration to play tennis.
 The character of Wakashi Hiyoshi from the Hyotei school was replaced by Egate Mcleod Higaki, who was created as an original character for the film. His sister, Shioin Higaki, is also an original character that was not in the manga/anime series, replacing Sakuno Ryuzaki.
 In the film, the Seigaku uniforms have a little flap on the back of the jackets (which were featured in the anime, but slowly disappeared in later episodes), and the blue colors are much brighter. Also, Echizen's shirt that he wears in the beginning is of a different design and colors.
 In the film, the Oishi/Kikumaru pair takes on the Oshitari/Mukahi pair, while originally it was the Momoshiro/Kikumaru pair who did so. Also, the results of their match and that of Inui and Kaidoh are reversed; in the film, they lose and the Inui/Kaidoh pair win, while the opposite happened in the manga/anime. Likewise, Fuji wins 6–0 in the film, while the manga/anime has Jirou Akutagawa, his opponent, take one game before Fuji shuts him out.
 The entire prefectural tournament, along with the matches against St. Rudolph and Yamabuki, are skipped over in the film.
 In the manga/anime, Echizen faces against Arai, another member of Seigaku's tennis club but not on the regular team, prior to becoming a regular. In the film, Kaidoh is the first to challenge Echizen. Because of this change, when Echizen plays in the ranking matches, he faces against Momoshiro and Inui. In the manga/anime, his second match was with Inui, but the first match was with Kaidoh.
 In the ranking match, Momoshiro has already developed the Jack Knife.
 Just before his match with Egate, Ryoma uses a line from the anime that Shusuke Fuji of Seigaku said to Kirihara Akaya of Rikkaidai, "A dog that doesn't bite barks the most".

Cast background
 The whole Seigaku cast is the same second musical cast from Tenimyu, except Ryoma, who was recast due to Kotaro Yanagi's accident, as well as to cast an actor closer to the character's age. However, the only members of another team from the musicals to reprise their roles were Koji Date as Choutaro Ohtori and Shun Takagi as Masaya Sakurai. Every other role in the film was entirely recast. For most of these actors, this film was their first major appearance in the film industry.
 Several former members of the musical cast make cameo appearances in the film, though not in the roles they played in the musicals (i.e.: Eiji Moriyama, who played Momoshiro in the first TeniMyu cast, makes an appearance as Genichirou Sanada from Rikkai; Yuichi Tsuchiya, who played Oishi in the first cast, also appears as Eishirou Kite from Higa).

Box office
The film debuted #10 in the Japanese box office.

DVD release
The DVD was released on September 28, 2006, in two editions: Premium Edition (9240 yen) and Regular Edition (4935 yen).

Prior to the film's release at the Japanese box office, a "making of" DVD entitled Prince of Tennis Navigate was also released for fans to purchase.

External links
 

2006 films
Anime films based on manga
Japanese sports films
Live-action films based on manga
Tennis films
Films scored by Taro Iwashiro
The Prince of Tennis